Extreme Characters (also known as brink users and extreme users) is a methodology used within user-centered design in order to represent edge case users of a product, brand or user interface. Extreme Characters also fits under the umbrella of market segmentation within marketing as it formulates design solutions for both average users and extreme, brink users. The concept of creating extreme users has been adopted heavily into the concept user-centered design and human-centered computing, and has led to its wide adoption both within online and offline applications, along with its placement within marketing communications.  

Extreme characters is based within designing for the brink users for a product, this behaviour is cultivated through the collection of data through focus groups and interviews with specific users. From this, a clear goal, or user need, is formulated.  By designing for a user need that is only reflected by a minority of the focus group, the use-case of extreme users is born. Through designing for this minority, design solutions stem for both use brink users, and the average user.

The concept of extreme characters has, however, come under scrutiny, leading to a critique of its placement within user-centered design and marketing. This scrutiny comes under the umbrella that it leads designers and marketers away from the target market for a specific product or service. Moreover, the critique also dictates that the methodology does not ultimately portray real end users of a specific product or service. 

Through the use of extreme users, designers are able to characterise and formulate their products needs to fit around the extreme users differing contexts.  By observing these work arounds the extreme users use, it allows for the designer to not only form a product for the general population, but for also these brink users.

Finally, the influence of extreme characters can be seen to have formed landmark technologies. This can clearly be seen with J. Djajadiningrat's Interaction Relabelling and Extreme Characters referencing the creation of first telephone by Alexander Graham Bell and the creation of the first closed source email protocol within the year 1972 by Vint Cerf. It also has a large play in modernistic technology and its overall design. This can be seen with the creation of the Nintendo Wii and the redesign of the Ford Focus.

History 

The earliest study that coined the name 'extreme characters/extreme users' for this approach was J. Djajadiningrat's Interaction Relabelling and Extreme Characters. It is here that the concept of using brink users for the exploration of unexplored use cases for a product or service. However, the concept of using extreme characters in the user experience of product or services can be dated back to the 19th century.

This can be seen with through Vint Cerf's exploration into programming a closed source email protocol within the year 1972. From his programming, he communicated that through the capability for electronic letters within a closed network, he was inherently able to talk to his deaf wife whilst they were both at work.

Moreover, another known landmark use of this design methodology before the cultivation of its academic recognition within the aforementioned J. Djajadiningrat's study, was Alexander Graham Bell's work with the deaf formulating in his patient  for the first telephone.  Through designing for patient with hearing difficulties, a user that is not inherently the 'generic user', Bell's work cultivated in one of the biggest telecommunication leaps in the modern age.

J. Djajadiningrat's study 
The first academic recognition of extreme users can be seen within Interaction Relabelling and Extreme Characters: Methods for Exploring Aesthetic Interactions. Through its citing of specific studies in the use-cases of personas, it brings to fruition how many studies had been citing the use of extreme characters within their product design without realising its academic potential. J. Djajadiningrat depicts this in judgement of Actors, Hairdos and Videotapes - Informance Design. which was already using extreme characters before the technique was coined. They used it in this design in order to steer away the product design away from the characters within a specific target group. He judges how through their accidental use of three extreme personas, a drug dealer, the Pope and a woman with two husbands. Following this, Djajadiningrat judged the development of each character in order to analyse the creation of specific products that helped their contexts. For the Pope, it was a product that gave status, for the drug dealer it was a product that highlighted secrecy and finally for the polyandrous wife, it created a product that designed a management system

Thereby, by J. Djajadingrat's study, the first academic recognition of extreme users formed the academic advantage of how the methodology can expose emotions and traits that are not obvious for standard user's scenario. Moreover, by utilising this technique, J Djajadiningrat argues that allows for designers to make more humane and human centric products and services.

Benefits 

In accordance with Martin Tomitsch, a lead user experience designer at the University of Sydney, the concept of "extreme characters" stems from the design process as it installs a consideration for the users outside of the typical and generic user base of a product or service. It can, thereby, provide a compelling design solution and focus in on constructing abstract data, that is received through user testing, into a complete design solution for the non stereotypical type of user of a product or service.

It is often used in the early stages of the design, according to Tomitsch, as it allows for the User Experience Designer to generate new problem aspects of the design, and, in hand, promote new elements and aspects of the design concept. Following this, representation of the 'extreme users', through other various User Experience methodologies, such as bodystorming or role playing into these type of characters, it can thereby promote a bigger picture of this character profile that the design team can manufacture and ideate a product or service towards.

As dictated by the Harvard Business School, an exploration of extreme users can be ventured into through several approaches. The analysis of representing extreme characters through personas is one approach, as dictated through Martin Tomitsch's study, however benefits can also present themselves if the extreme consumer is donned by the very designers. This can be seen with studies, such as the redesign of the Ford Focus, that showed the benefits of the methodology by the engineers physically becoming these extreme consumers.

Acclaimed usages of the methodology

August de los Reyes 
Global recognition, within the user experience community, of this methodology resounded with the appearance of the 'extreme user' approach by August de los Reyes, a lead designer for the Xbox One. This occurred due to his recent wheelchair bound state, resulting in him creating a design for the video game console that could be accessed by the non-conventional user of the device, individuals who are wheelchair bound.

Chris Messina and Twitter's hashtags 
Moreover, often cited as the "father of the hashtag", Chris Messina proposed, a tweet in 2007, the concept of having a metadata tag to group specific events that could generated by users on the social media platform Twitter in order to create order to constant streams of tweets. It would thereby, also, allow users to find similar messages and people who are also reacting and replying to this specific theme or event.

Twitters initial response to this proposition by Messina was quoted to be "these things are for nerds". However, through extreme users of the Twitter platform, as seen with the fire that ravished through San Diego within 2007 saw the first "social trend" of a hashtag.  

The hashtag "#sandiegofire" allowed users to gain easily updates on the fire location and track constant news outlets. Through this, the benefits were saw by the Twitter platform itself and was quickly implemented by the platform. Using the hashtag has become prominent on the internet and, as calculated in 2018, 85% of websites that can be found in the top 50 websites (as based by traffic) use the hashtag. as a way for users to be able to  group metadata and content under a specific hashtag.    

This use of extreme users adopting this service, proposed by Messina,  promoted this thinking of designing for use cases for individuals effected by events like the 2007 wildfires and how specific products will benefit them.

The Nintendo Wii 
In accordance to the Harvard University Business School, the Nintendo Wii game console stemmed from Nintendo researching into the extreme users of the gaming market, people who hate playing games on gaming consoles. From this, apparent research took place and resulted in an array of information about the struggles of gaming for the "non-gamer".  This included that, at the current gaming environment at the time before the launch of the Wii, consoles were too complicated and that the console controllers were too difficult to operate. In response, the Nintendo Wii was born. The controlled they designed was motion controlled which emulated all the real-life motions in order to counteract this difficulty for users with the original gaming controllers. Moreover, the system designed used easier to understand graphics to avoid the convoluted user interface. The Wii was a revolution and, through Nintendo's analysis of extreme users, it created this instant hit of a console. In all the Nintendo Wii is the fifth best selling game console ever put to market  and has forced the competition in the gaming market to follow suit with its motion controlled gestures that mimic real life. This is abundantly clear with the subsequent creations of the Xbox Kinect and the PlayStation Move. Both these products were made as a result of the design leap that the Wii took from its exploration within the extreme characters design methodology.

The Ford Focus redesign 
The Ford team used the extreme user approach in their engineering of the Ford Focus. Through their approach of learning from an extreme demographic of the user of their car, the elderly with physical limitations, they were able to dictate the troublesome tasks for this age bracket. By observing this specific user in this demographic, it was clear that their physical constraints made it difficult for them to use different functionalities of the car, such as the seatbelt.

Through using specific body suits that removed motion around the legs, arms and neck movements, with similar constraints put on for hearing and sight, the engineers became this extreme user.

By the engineers becoming the user, they released how the different designs of the Focus forced difficulty for users with these physical limitations. Thereby, through this method of design, the end redesign of the car focused on this accessibility factor. It allowed for new features that promoted accessibility for not only this demographic, but provided important features for all consumers.

Critique and criticism 
As dictated through Prof. Luciano Gualberto's research into user modelling through personas and extreme characters, the concept of using an extreme scenario for a user will, in hand, lead the user to situations that they can design for, but in reality, are viewed as redundant.  As taken from his research User Modelling with Personas,  he brings to light this concept of designing for an extreme user, a drug dealer, who could use a specific service to hide a 'secret agenda', in this case it would be hiding an organised crime syndicate. However, Gualberto argues that the senior, generic user, will not need the same complexity of secrecy which, in hand, formulates this concept of "feature overload" - where the resources available clutter the real, usable data on the interface of the product or service.

Gualberto's concluding critique of the methodology formulates the concept that the extreme user does lead to new design and user requirements, however, the difficulty of recognising of the important user needs within the user experience process as a whole can stem from the extreme user approach. Moreover, the method does not depict the real user need of the system, product or service and, in hand, the methodology does not argue for much creation time during the design process.

References 

Usability
Design